Anabar may refer to:

 Anabar Bay, Laptev Sea
 Anabar Constituency, Nauru
 Anabar District, Nauru
 Anabar District, Russia, Sakha, Russia
 Anabar Highway, Russia
 Anabar Plateau, Russia
 Anabar (river), Sakha, Russia
 Anabar Shield, Russia